is a passenger railway station in the town of Shisui, Chiba Prefecture, Japan, operated by the East Japan Railway Company (JR East).

Lines
Minami-Shisui Station is served by the Sōbu Main Line, and is located 59.3 km from the western terminus of the line at Tokyo Station.

Station layout
The station consists of a single island platform connected to the station building by a footbridge.  The platforms are short and can only accommodate trains of eight carriages in length. The station is unattended.

Platforms

History
Minami-Shisui Station was opened on September 10, 1914 as a station on the Japanese Government Railway (JGR)  for both passenger and freight operations. After World War II, the JGR became the Japan National Railways (JNR). Scheduled freight operations were suspended from October 1, 1962. A new station building was completed in 1980. The station was absorbed into the JR East network upon the privatization of the Japan National Railways (JNR) on April 1, 1987. The station waiting room was renovated in 2008.

Passenger statistics
In fiscal 2006, the station was used by an average of 208 passengers daily

Surrounding area
 Iinuma Honke Corporation
Shisui Premium Outlet Mall

See also
 List of railway stations in Japan

References

External links

 JR East station information 

Railway stations in Japan opened in 1914
Railway stations in Chiba Prefecture
Sōbu Main Line
Shisui